Angels of the Street may refer to:
 Angels of the Street (1969 film), a West German crime film
 Angels of the Street (1953 film), a Cuban-Mexican drama film